Jeanne-Marie Busuttil (born 29 June 1976) is a former professional golfer from France who was a member of the LPGA Tour in the early 2000s.

Amateur career 
Busuttil was born in Paris, France and moved to America where she attended the University of Florida and Arizona State University, playing on teams for both schools. Busuttil won the French Junior Championship in 1991 and became a member of the French National team from 1993 to 1997. While at Arizona State University, she won two collegiate tournaments: the 1996 NCAA East Regional and the 1995 South Carolina Invitational. She was a three-time NCAA All-American and was a member of the 1997-98 NCAA Championship team at Arizona State.

Professional career 
Busuttil turned professional in August 1998 after lettering at Arizona State from 1996 to 1998.  In 2001, she finished second at the LPGA Final Qualifying Tournament to earn exempt status for the 2002 season.  She competed on the Futures Tour, where she won one tournament and finished fifth on the money list.  She was also a member of the Ladies European Tour.

Professional wins (1)

Futures Tour wins (1)
2001 M&T Bank Loretto FUTURES Golf Classic

Team appearances
Amateur
European Ladies' Team Championship (representing France): 1997

See also 

 List of Florida Gators women's golfers on the LPGA Tour

References

External links 

Jeanne-Marie Busuttil on Yahoo! Sports
Florida Players Honor Roll
Florida Players on the LPGA

French female golfers
Florida Gators women's golfers
Arizona State Sun Devils women's golfers
LPGA Tour golfers
Ladies European Tour golfers
Golfers from Paris
1976 births
Living people